In Hinduism, the Brahma Sampradaya is the disciplic succession (sampradaya) of gurus starting with Brahma. The term is most often used to refer to the beliefs and teachings of Madhvacharya, his Dvaita Vedanta philosophy and Sadh Vaishnavism, Vaishnavism section founded by Madhvacharya.

The longer-term Brahma-Madhva-Gaudiya Sampradaya, or simply Madhva-Gaudiya Sampradaya, is used to refer to the teachings of Chaitanya Mahaprabhu and his Gaudiya Vaishnava theology.

Followers of this tradition believe that Vedic knowledge descends from Brahma. In the Vedic conception, these sampradayas began at the creation of the universe and endure to the present moment due to the consistency of the transmission of knowledge, all the previous gurus are present in the teachings of the present spiritual master. The Vedic process assures that the transmission remains pure by assuring the qualifications of the transmitter.

See also
Brahma Samhita
Kashi Math
Sree Venu Gopala Swamy, Purakkad

References

Madhva tradition
Dvaita Vedanta